Georgios Donis (born 22 October 1969) is a Greek former professional footballer who played as a midfielder and currently a manager. He is the current manager of Saudi Arabian club Al-Fateh. He was the first ever Greek to play in the English Premier League. In England, he was also known as George Donis.

Early years
Donis was born and raised in Frankfurt, West Germany until he was six years old and the family moved back to their native Greece. His parents had lived in Frankfurt for "many years" and he has still family ties there.

Club career
Donis started his senior career with PAS Giannina in 1990, and after one successful year he moved to Panathinaikos. The fans of Panathinaikos, known for their love for nicknames, named him the Train for his remarkable acceleration.

On 5 June 1996, after helping the Greek club reach the UEFA Champions League semi-finals against Ajax FC, Donis moved to Blackburn Rovers on a free transfer, making use of the then recent Bosman ruling signing for 1.1 billion drachmas, a record amount for Greek players at the time. He had an erratic season with Blackburn, scoring against Everton and Coventry City.
He returned home to play for AEK Athens, before returning to England, playing for Sheffield United and Huddersfield Town where he ended his career.

International career
Donis made his debut for the Greece national football team on 22 December 1991, in a 1–1 draw against Malta for the UEFA Euro 1992 qualifying round. He appeared in 24 matches and scored five goals during his international career with Greece.

Managerial career

AEL
After the end of his playing career, he turned to coaching. Starting in 2002, he led Zografou-based Ilisiakos in two consecutive promotions from 4th to 2nd Greek football level. He then made the move to AEL, where after one season he managed to bring the team to the Greek Superleague from the second division and finished them in 8th place the following year. In 2007, Larissa finished only 10th in the league but he managed to bring them the Greek Cup after defeating Panathinaikos 2–1 in the final. In his first taste of European football management, his team AE Larissa defeated his former team Blackburn Rovers to reach the 2007–08 UEFA Cup group stages. He finished a great year in 6th place in the league, missing out on the season play-off's on goal difference.

AEK Athens
On 25 April 2008, Donis stepped down as manager of AEL and on 14 May he was appointed as head coach of AEK Athens.
On 17 November 2008, due to a string of poor performances and early knock out from the UEFA Cup, AEK parted company with him just six months after his appointment.

Atromitos
In 2009, Donis was appointed by Atromitos and in the 2010–11 season he again reached the Greek Cup Final only to lose 0–3 to his former team AEK Athens. In the next year, Atromitos enjoyed another successful spell under his guidance, reaching the Greek Cup Final for a second consecutive time (losing 1–2 to Olympiacos at extra time), as well as participating at the Greek Superleague play-offs.

PAOK
On 31 May 2012, PAOK appointed Donis as the new manager of the club, on a two-year contract, with immediate effect. On 28 April 2013, after a crucial defeat 0–2 and the elimination in the semi-final of Greek Cup by Asteras Tripolis, he was sacked by chairman Ivan Savvidis.

APOEL
On 11 October 2013, Donis signed a contract until the end of the 2013–14 season with the reigning Cypriot champions APOEL, replacing Paulo Sérgio who had been fired on 4 October 2013. In his first season at APOEL, Donis achieved to win the double. He won his first title with APOEL on 21 May 2014, when he led his team to a 2–0 victory over Ermis Aradippou in the Cypriot Cup final. Ten days later, Donis won also the Cypriot First Division after APOEL's 1–0 away victory against AEL Limassol in the title deciding match and won his first league title in his managerial career.

Following a successful first season in the club, Giorgos Donis signed a one-year contract extension with APOEL on 26 June 2014. In August 2014, Donis led APOEL into the group stages of the 2014–15 UEFA Champions League, after eliminating HJK Helsinki (4–2 on aggregate) in the third qualifying round and trashing Aalborg BK 5–1 on aggregate in the play-off round of the competition. APOEL were drawn in Group F alongside Barcelona, Paris Saint-Germain and Ajax. Donis led his team to some great performances in the group stage, but APOEL managed to collect only one point after drawing 1–1 with Ajax at home. In their other five Group F matches, APOEL lost twice to Barcelona (0–4 at home, 0–1 away), lost twice to Paris Saint-Germain (0–1 at home, 0–1 away) and also lost to Ajax 0–4 away.

On 6 January 2015, APOEL and Giorgos Donis parted company by mutual agreement after a poor run of performances and results, culminating in a 1–1 home draw against the last-placed Ayia Napa.

Al-Hilal
On 25 February 2015, he was appointed as the new manager of Al-Hilal in Saudi Arabia, signing a contract until the end of the season. He helped Al-Hilal to qualify in the semi-final of the 2015 AFC Champions League. On 6 June, Donis won the first title with Al-Hilal after defeating Al-Nassr in the final of the 2015 King Cup of Champions.

Al-Sharjah
On 28 July 2016, he was appointed as the new manager of Al-Sharjah in UAE, signing a contract until the summer of 2018.

Second spell in APOEL
On 28 July 2017, Donis signed a contract until the end of the 2017–18 season with the reigning Cypriot champions APOEL, replacing Mario Been who had been sacked by APOEL following a 1–0 away European defeat to Viitorul Constanta. On 23 March 2018, APOEL have sacked Donis, and have replaced him with 40-year-old Portuguese manager Bruno Baltazar. The last straw seemed to be APOEL's recent 4–2 away defeat against Apollon Limassol, which saw APOEL fall out of first place in the Cypriot First Division. Expectations have become quite high at APOEL in recent years. The Nicosia giants have won the Cypriot First Division the last 5 seasons, and 7 of the last 9 campaigns. With that domestic run now in jeopardy, APOEL have made the move to replace Donis with the Portuguese coach.

Panathinaikos
Donis was appointed on 3 July 2018 as the new manager of his former club as a player, Panathinaikos, signing a three-year contract. On 19 July 2020, after the end of the Superleague playoffs,  he left the club by mutual consent, mainly as a result of his strenuous relationship with the Panathinaikos board and chairman Giannis Alafouzos.

Μaccabi Tel Aviv 
Donis signed a contract with Maccabi Tel Aviv. He led the team to the Play Offs of the UEFA Champions League where he was eliminated by Red Bull Salzburg while in the UEFA Europa League he managed to lead the team to the round of 32. He was fired on December 22, 2020 as the team was in 5th place in the league.

Al-Wehda 
In March 2021, he became the manager of Saudi club Al Wehda.

Al-Fateh 
On 16 January 2022, Donis was appointed as the manager of Saudi club Al-Fateh.

Managerial statistics

Honours

Player

Panathinaikos
Greek League: 1994–95, 1995–96
Greek Cup: 1992–93, 1993–94, 1994–95
Greek Super Cup: 1993, 1994

Manager

Ilisiakos
Gamma Ethniki: 2003–04
Delta Ethniki: 2002–03

AEL
Greek Cup: 2006–07
Greek Second Division: 2004–05

Atromitos
Greek Cup: Runner-up 2010–11, 2011–12

APOEL
Cypriot League: 2013–14, 2017–18
Cypriot Cup: 2013–14

Al-Hilal
King Cup of Champions: 2015
Saudi Super Cup: 2015
Saudi Crown Prince Cup: 2015–16

Maccabi Tel Aviv
Toto Cup Al: 2020–21

Individual
Top Scorer of Greek Cup: 1994–95 (11 goals)
Best Manager in Greece: 2011–12 (with Ernesto Valverde)

References

External links

1969 births
Living people
German footballers
Greek footballers
PAS Giannina F.C. players
Panathinaikos F.C. players
Blackburn Rovers F.C. players
AEK Athens F.C. players
Sheffield United F.C. players
Huddersfield Town A.F.C. players
Super League Greece players
Premier League players
English Football League players
Footballers from Frankfurt
Greece international footballers
Greek football managers
Athlitiki Enosi Larissa F.C. managers
AEK Athens F.C. managers
Atromitos F.C. managers
PAOK FC managers
APOEL FC managers
Panathinaikos F.C. managers
Greek expatriate footballers
Super League Greece managers
Al Hilal SFC managers
Al-Sharjah SCC managers
UAE Pro League managers
Expatriate footballers in England
Greek expatriate sportspeople in England
Expatriate football managers in Saudi Arabia
Expatriate football managers in the United Arab Emirates
Expatriate football managers in Cyprus
Expatriate football managers in Israel
Maccabi Tel Aviv F.C. managers
Al-Wehda Club (Mecca) managers
Al-Fateh SC managers
Association football midfielders
Mediterranean Games gold medalists for Greece
Mediterranean Games medalists in football
Competitors at the 1991 Mediterranean Games
Saudi Professional League managers
German people of Greek descent
Greek expatriate sportspeople in Saudi Arabia
Greek expatriate sportspeople in the United Arab Emirates
Greek expatriate sportspeople in Cyprus
Greek expatriate sportspeople in Israel
Greek expatriate football managers